Tagalog may refer to:

 Tagalog language, a language spoken in the Philippines

Other
 Tagalog people, a major ethnic group in the Philippines
 Southern Tagalog, a region in southern Luzon that is the heartland of the Tagalog people
 Tagalog, ethnic group living near in the river, or so called "Taga-ilog"
 Tagalog Republic or Katagalugan, revolutionary governments during the Philippine Revolution
 Tagalog War, another name for the Philippine Revolution
 Tagalog (beetle), a genus of beetles in the subfamily Prioninae

Language and nationality disambiguation pages